The 1997–98 Ukrainian Hockey League season was the fifth season of the Ukrainian Hockey League, the top level of ice hockey in Ukraine. Seven teams participated in the league, and HC Sokil Kyiv won the championship.

Regular season

Playoffs
Semifinals
HC Sokil Kyiv 7 - Sdyushor Kharkiv 3
Berkut Kharkov 3 - Politechink Yasya Kyiv 2
Final
HC Sokil Kyiv 5 - Berkut Kharkiv 2
3rd place
Politechnik Yasya Kyiv 8 - Sdyushor Kharkov 3

External links
Ukrainian Ice Hockey Federation 

UKHL
Ukrainian Hockey Championship seasons
Ukr
1998 in Ukrainian sport